Retziusfjellet is a mountain on Kongsøya in Kong Karls Land, Svalbard. It is named after Swedish physician Gustaf Retzius. The mountain reaches a height of 320 meters, and is the highest point of Kongsøya. 
It is located south of Hårfagrehaugen (304 m.a.s.l.), and northwest of Tordenskjoldberget.

References

Mountains of Svalbard
Kongsøya